Alopecurus setarioides is a species of foxtail grass that is found in France, Greece, Italy and Turkey. It prefers wet places, including ditches.

References

setarioides
Bunchgrasses of Europe
Flora of France
Flora of Greece
Flora of Italy
Flora of Turkey